Thaumastoptera is a genus of crane fly in the family Limoniidae.

Species
Subgenus Taiwanita Alexander, 1929
T. issikiana Alexander, 1929
Subgenus Thaumastoptera Mik, 1866
T. calceata Mik, 1866
T. hynesi Alexander, 1964
T. insignis Lackschewitz, 1940
T. intermixta Savchenko, 1974
T. maculivena Alexander, 1931
T. natalensis Alexander, 1956
T. nilgiriensis Alexander, 1951
T. stuckenbergi Alexander, 1961

References

Limoniidae
Diptera of Asia
Diptera of Europe
Diptera of Africa
Diptera of North America